"La Bilirrubina" is a song by Dominican singer-songwriter Juan Luis Guerra. It was written by Guerra and released by Karem Records on 1990 and 1991 in Europe as the second single from his fifth studio album, Bachata Rosa. It was nominated for Record of the Year at 1991 Lo Nuestro Awards. The merengue track is considered one of Guerra's signature songs and most popular. It receive positive reviews and was listed one of the best tracks of the album.

The track was included on Guerra's greatest hits album Grandes Éxitos Juan Luis Guerra y 440. Live versions of the track had been included on A Son de Guerra Tour (2013) and Entre Mar y Palmeras in 2021. In the United States it was re-released as a doble single with "De tu Boca" in 1991. In Europe, it was released as a double single along with track Rosalia. In Colombia, it was released as double single along with Ay Mujer! in 1990.

Track listing 

 La Bilirrubina – 4:05
 Bachata Rosa – 4:18

Charts

References 

1990 singles
1990 songs
Juan Luis Guerra songs
Songs written by Juan Luis Guerra